Battle on Buka Street is a 2022 Nigerian comedy drama film directed by Funke Akindele and Tobi Makinde. The film is jointly produced as a collaboration between Funke Ayotunde Akindele Network (FAAN) and FilmOne Entertainment. The film had its theatrical release on 16 December 2022 and opened to extremely positive reviews from critics. The film became a huge box office success.

Synopsis 
The plot revolves around the battle between two women who confront each other in a food challenge in order to win the prestigious 'King of Buka Street' which is a title conferred to the best local food seller in the region.

Cast 
 Funke Akindele as Yejide 
 Mercy Johnson as Awele 
 Sola Sobowale as Asake
 Tina Mba as Ezinne 
 Nkem Owoh as Maduka
 Femi Jacobs as Lanshile 
 Kelvin Ikeduba
 Bimbo Ademoye Young Asake
 Moshood Fattah as Ademide
 Mike Afolarin
 Wumi Toriola
 Regina Chukwu
 Tobi Makinde

Production 
The film project marked the third directorial venture for actress Funke Akindele after Your Excellency and Omo Ghetto: The Saga. The film also possibly marked the final film venture for Funke Akindele who has insisted to join politics and to run as a frontrunner in the election.

Box office 
It became the second highest grossing Nigerian film of the year 2022 just behind Brotherhood grossing about ₦200,087,222 at the box office. The film surpassed Avatar: The Way of Water as the highest grossing film in Nigeria during the Christmas weekend grossing almost ₦50 million at the box office. The film also grossed ₦26 million at the box office on 25 December 2022 coinciding with Christmas making it the highest grossing Nigerian film on a single day in 2022.

References

External links 

 

2022 films
English-language Nigerian films
2022 comedy-drama films
Nigerian comedy-drama films
2020s English-language films